Blakesley School may refer to the following primary schools in England, UK:
Blakesley School, a defunct private school in Worcester Park, Surrey
Blakesley Church of England Primary School, a voluntary controlled school in Blakesley, Northamptonshire 
Blakesley Hall Primary School, a state school near Blakesley Hall in Yardley, Birmingham